Ugga-bala (Arakanese:ဥဂ္ဂါဗလာ,  was the 25th king of the Mrauk-U Dynasty of Arakan. He succeeded his father, Sanda Thudhamma after his abdication in 1674.

References

Bibliography
 
 
 
 

Monarchs of Mrauk-U
17th century in Burma
17th-century Burmese monarchs